Evans Park is a suburb of Johannesburg, South Africa. It is located in Region 9.

References

Johannesburg Region F